This is a list of fossiliferous stratigraphic units in Greenland.

List of fossiliferous stratigraphic units

See also 

 List of fossiliferous stratigraphic units in Antarctica
 Lists of fossiliferous stratigraphic units in North America
 List of fossiliferous stratigraphic units in the Northwest Territories
 List of fossiliferous stratigraphic units in Nunavut
 List of fossiliferous stratigraphic units in Newfoundland and Labrador
 Lists of fossiliferous stratigraphic units in Europe
 List of fossiliferous stratigraphic units in Iceland
 List of fossiliferous stratigraphic units in Norway
 List of fossiliferous stratigraphic units in Russia
 List of fossiliferous stratigraphic units in Svalbard

References

Bibliography

Further reading 

 C. B. Skovsted and J. S. Peel. 2011. Hyolithellus in life position from the Lower Cambrian of north Greenland. Journal of Paleontology 85(1):37-47
 A. C. Daley and J. S. Peel. 2010. A Possible Anomalocaridid from the Cambrian Sirius Passet Lagerstätte, North Greenland. Journal of Paleontology 84(2):352-355
 G. E. Budd and J. S. Peel. 1998. A new xenusiid lobopod from the Early Cambrian Sirius Passet fauna of North Greenland. Palaeontology 41(6):1201-1213
 M. Williams, D. J. Siveter, and J. S. Peel. 1996. Isoxys (arthropoda) from the Early Cambrian Sirius Passet Lagerstaette, North Greenland. Journal of Paleontology 70(6):947-954
 S. Conway Morris and J. S. Peel. 1990. Articulated halkieriids from the Lower Cambrian of north Greenland. Nature 345(28):802-805
 J. K. Rigby. 1986. Cambrian and Silurian sponges from North Greenland. Rapport Groenlands Geologiske Undersoegelse 132:51-63
 G. Säve-Söderbergh. 1935. On the dermal bones of the head in labyrinthodont stegocephalians and primitive Reptilia, with special reference to Eotriassic stegocephalians from East Greenland. Meddelelser om Grønland 98(3):1-211

 
Greenland
Greenland
 
Fossiliferous stratigraphic units